Wihtlæg, Whitlæg, Wighlek, Wiglecus, Wiglek, Witlac or Viglek is a legendary king of either Denmark or Angeln in Germanic legends. He is known in Saxo's kings of Denmark by the name of Vigletus.

In the Anglo-Saxon royal genealogies, Whitlæg is a descendant of Woden. According to the genealogies in the Anglian collection, Woden's son Weothulgeot was ancestor to the royal house of Mercia and the father of Whitlæg. According to the Historia Britonum, Weothulgeot was father of Weaga who was father of Whitlæg. But the two Anglo-Saxon Chronicle versions of this genealogy include neither Weothulgeot nor Weaga but make Whitlæg himself the son of Woden. In all versions Whitlæg is father of Wermund, father of Offa of Angel. According to the Old English poem Widsith Offa ruled over the continental Angles.

Wiglek

The 12th-century Gesta Danorum tells that when the Danish king Rorik Slyngebond had died Wiglek succeeded him. He took all the wealth from the mother of Amleth and complained about Amleth's actions as the ruler of Jutland. Amleth, on the other hand offered Wiglek riches, in reconciliation. Wiglek disposed of Fiallar, the ruler of Scania who retired to Undensakre, and then he mustered the leidang of Zealand and Scania, and sent a message to Amleth challenging him to war. In the battle Amleth fell, and his wife Hermutrude gave up herself as Wiglek's spoil of war. Wiglek died of illness and was succeeded by his son Wermund, the father of Uffo (Offa). Kemp Malone suggested that Saxo's Wiglek "probably represents a fusion of the Geatish Wiglaf and the Anglian Wihtlaeg."

Notes

References

External links
 Peter Tunstall's translation of the Chronicon lethrense at The Chronicle of the Kings of Lejre and Northvegr: The Saga of Hrolf Kraki: The Chronicle of the Kings of Lejre.
Book four of Gesta Danorum at the Medieval and Classical Literature Library

Mythological kings of Denmark
Anglish warriors
Amleth